Arnold Daniel Palmer (September 10, 1929 – September 25, 2016) was an American professional golfer who is widely regarded as one of the greatest and most charismatic players in the sport's history. Dating back to 1955, he won numerous events on both the PGA Tour and the circuit now known as PGA Tour Champions. Nicknamed The King, Palmer was one of golf's most popular stars and seen as a trailblazer, the first superstar of the sport's television age, which began in the 1950s.

Palmer's social impact on golf was unrivaled among fellow professionals; his modest origins and plain-spoken popularity helped change the perception of golf from an elite, upper-class pastime of private clubs to a more populist sport accessible to middle and working classes via public courses. Palmer, Jack Nicklaus, and Gary Player were "The Big Three" in golf during the 1960s; they are credited with popularizing and commercializing the sport around the world.

In a career spanning more than six decades, Palmer won 62 PGA Tour titles from 1955 to 1973. He is fifth on the Tour's all-time victory list, trailing only Sam Snead, Tiger Woods, Jack Nicklaus, and Ben Hogan. He won seven major titles in a six-plus-year domination from the 1958 Masters to the 1964 Masters. He also won the PGA Tour Lifetime Achievement Award in 1998, and in 1974 was one of the 13 original inductees into the World Golf Hall of Fame.

Early life

Arnold Daniel Palmer was born on September 10, 1929, to Doris (née Morrison) and Milfred Jerome "Deacon" Palmer in Latrobe, Pennsylvania, a working-class steel mill town. He learned golf from his father, who had suffered from polio at a young age and was head professional and greenskeeper at Latrobe Country Club, which allowed young Palmer to accompany his father as he maintained the course.

Palmer attended Wake Forest College on a golf scholarship. He left upon the death of close friend Bud Worsham and enlisted in the U.S. Coast Guard, where he served for three years, 1951–1954. At the Coast Guard Training Center in Cape May, New Jersey, he built a nine-hole course and had some time to continue to hone his golf skills. After Palmer's enlistment term ended, he returned to college and competitive golf.

Palmer won the 1954 U.S. Amateur in Detroit and made the decision to turn pro in November of that year. "That victory was the turning point in my life," he said. "It gave me confidence I could compete at the highest level of the game." When reporters there asked Gene Littler who the young golfer was that was cracking balls on the practice tee, Littler said: "That's Arnold Palmer. He's going to be a great player some day. When he hits the ball, the earth shakes."

After winning that match, Palmer quit his job selling paint and played in the Waite Memorial tournament in Shawnee-on-Delaware, Pennsylvania. There, he met his future wife, Winifred Walzer, and they remained married for 45 years until her death in 1999.

On November 17, 1954, Palmer announced his intentions to turn pro. "What other people find in poetry, I find in the flight of a good drive," Palmer said.

Career
Palmer's first tour win came during his 1955 rookie season, when he won the Canadian Open and earned $2,400 for his efforts. He raised his game status for the next several seasons. Palmer's charisma was a major factor in establishing golf as a compelling television event in the 1950s and 1960s, which set the stage for the popularity it enjoys today. His first major championship win at the 1958 Masters Tournament, where he earned $11,250, established his position as one of the leading stars in golf, and by 1960 he had signed up as pioneering sports agent Mark McCormack's first client.

In later interviews, McCormack listed five attributes that made Palmer especially marketable: his handsomeness; his relatively modest background (his father was a greenskeeper before rising to be club professional and Latrobe was a humble club); the way he played golf, taking risks and wearing his emotions on his sleeve; his involvement in a string of exciting finishes in early televised tournaments; and his affability.

Palmer is also credited by many for securing the status of The Open Championship (British Open) among U.S. players. Before Ben Hogan won that championship in 1953, few American professionals had traveled to play in The Open, due to its extensive travel requirements, relatively small purse, and the style of its links courses (radically different from most American courses). Palmer wanted to emulate the feats of his predecessors Bobby Jones, Sam Snead and Hogan in his quest to become a leading American golfer.

In particular, Palmer traveled to Scotland in 1960 to compete in the British Open for the first time. He had already won both the Masters and U.S. Open and was trying to emulate Hogan's 1953 feat of winning all three tournaments in a single year. Palmer played what he himself said were the four best rounds of his career, shooting 70-71-70-68. His scores had the English excitedly claiming that Palmer may well be the greatest golfer ever to play the game. British fans were excited about Palmer's playing in the Open. Although he failed to win, losing out to Kel Nagle by a single shot, his subsequent Open wins in the early 1960s convinced many American pros that a trip to Britain would be worth the effort, and certainly secured Palmer's popularity among British and European fans, not just American ones.

Palmer was greatly disappointed by his runner-up finish in the 1960 British Open. His appearance overseas drew American attention to the Open Championship, which had previously been ignored by the American golfers. Palmer went on to win the Open Championship in 1961 and 1962, and last played in it in 1995. Martin Slumbers, chief executive of The R&A, called Palmer "a true gentleman, one of the greatest ever to play the game and a truly iconic figure in sport". His participation in The Open Championship in the early 1960s "was the catalyst to truly internationalize golf," said European Tour chief executive Keith Pelley.

Palmer won seven major championships:
 Masters Tournament: 1958, 1960, 1962, 1964
 U.S. Open: 1960
 The Open Championship: 1961, 1962

Palmer's most prolific years were 1960–1963, when he won 29 PGA Tour events, including five major tournaments, in four seasons. In 1960, he won the Hickok Belt as the top professional athlete of the year and Sports Illustrated magazine's "Sportsman of the Year" award. He built up a wide fan base, often referred to as "Arnie's Army", and in 1967 he became the first man to reach $1million in career earnings on the PGA Tour. By the late 1960s Jack Nicklaus and Gary Player had both acquired clear ascendancy in their rivalry, but Palmer won a PGA Tour event every year from 1955 to 1971 inclusive, and in 1971 he enjoyed a revival, winning four events.

For each of his wins at the Masters, Palmer's caddie was Nathaniel "Iron Man" Avery; at the time, Augusta National required all golfers to use the club's own caddies.

Palmer won the Vardon Trophy for lowest scoring average four times: 1961, 1962, 1964, and 1967. He played on six Ryder Cup teams: 1961, 1963, 1965, 1967, 1971, and 1973. He was the last playing captain in 1963, and captained the team again in 1975.

Palmer was eligible for the Senior PGA Tour (now PGA Tour Champions) from its first season in 1980, and he was one of the marquee names who helped it to become successful. He won ten events on the tour, including five senior majors.

Palmer won the first World Match Play Championship that was held in England. The event was originally organized by McCormack to showcase his stable of players. Their partnership was one of the most significant in the history of sports marketing. Long after he ceased to win tournaments, Palmer remained one of the highest earners in golf due to his appeal to sponsors and the public.

In 2004, he competed in the Masters Tournament for the last time, marking his 50th consecutive appearance in that event. At his death, he and Jack Nicklaus were the only two Masters champions to be regular members of Masters organizer Augusta National Golf Club (as opposed to the honorary membership the club grants to all Masters champions).

From 2007 until his death, Palmer served as an honorary starter for the Masters. He retired from tournament golf on October 13, 2006, when he withdrew from the Champions Tours' Administaff Small Business Classic after four holes due to dissatisfaction with his own play. He played the remaining holes but did not keep score.

Golf businesses
Palmer had a diverse golf-related business career, including owning the Bay Hill Club and Lodge in Orlando, Florida, which is the venue for the PGA Tour's Arnold Palmer Invitational (renamed from the Bay Hill Invitational in 2007), helping to found The Golf Channel, and negotiating the deal to build the first golf course in the People's Republic of China. This led to the formation of Palmer Course Design in 1972, which was renamed Arnold Palmer Design Company when the company moved to Orlando, Florida, in 2006. Palmer's design partner was Ed Seay.

Palmer designed more than 300 golf courses in 37 states, 25 countries, and five continents (all except Africa and Antarctica), including the first modern course built in China, in 1988. In 1971, he purchased Latrobe Country Club (where his father used to be the club professional) and owned it until his death. The licensing, endorsements, spokesman associations and commercial partnerships built by Palmer and McCormack are managed by Arnold Palmer Enterprises. Palmer was also a member of the American Society of Golf Course Architects.

In 1997, Palmer and fellow golfer Tiger Woods initiated a civil case in an effort to stop the unauthorized sale of their images and alleged signatures in the memorabilia market. The lawsuit was filed against Bruce Matthews, the owner of Gotta Have It Golf, Inc. and others. Matthews and associated parties counter-claimed that Palmer and associated businesses committed several acts, including breach of contract, breach of implied duty of good faith and violations of Florida's Deceptive and Unfair Trade Practices Act. On March 12, 2014, a Florida jury ruled in favor of Gotta Have It on its breach of contract and other related claims. The same jury rejected the counterclaims of Palmer and Woods, and awarded Gotta Have It $668,346 in damages.

One of Palmer's most recent products (mass-produced starting in 2001) is a branded use of the beverage known as the Arnold Palmer, which combines sweetened iced tea with lemonade.

Automotive businesses
As a member of the Lincoln-Mercury Sports Panel, in the early 1970s Palmer was a brand ambassador for Lincoln-Mercury. In 1974, Palmer, along with partners Mark McCormack and Don Massey, purchased a Cadillac dealership in Charlotte, North Carolina. Over the years, Palmer would acquire several other dealerships in several states including a Buick-Cadillac store in his hometown of Latrobe.  The Latrobe dealership, known as Arnold Palmer Motors, closed in 2017 after 36 years in business.

Legacy

According to Adam Schupak of Golf Week, "No one did more to popularize the sport than Palmer". "His dashing presence singlehandedly took golf out of the country clubs and into the mainstream. Quite simply, he made golf cool." Jack Nicklaus said: 

He is mentioned by James Bond's caddie in Goldfinger: "If that's [Goldfinger's] original ball, I'm Arnold Palmer."

In 2000, Palmer was ranked the sixth greatest player of all time in Golf Digest magazine's rankings, and by 2008 had earned an estimated $30 million.

Palmer was inducted into Omicron Delta Kappa - The National Leadership Honor Society in 1964 at Wake Forest University. He was awarded the Presidential Medal of Freedom in 2004 and the Congressional Gold Medal in 2009. He was the first golfer to be awarded the Presidential Medal of Freedom and the second golfer, after Byron Nelson, to be awarded the Congressional Gold Medal.

In addition to Palmer's impressive list of awards, he was bestowed the honor of kicking off the Masters Tournament beginning in 2007. From 2007 to 2009, Palmer was the sole honorary starter. In 2010, longtime friend and competitor Jack Nicklaus was appointed by Augusta National to join Palmer. In 2012, golf's The Big Three reunited as South African golfer Gary Player joined for the ceremonial tee shots as honorary starters for the 76th playing of the Masters Tournament. In describing the effect that Palmer had on the sport, biographer James Dodson stated:

Personal life

Palmer was married to the former Winnie Walzer for 45 years; the couple had two daughters. Winnie died at age 65 on November 20, 1999, from complications due to ovarian cancer. His grandson, Sam Saunders, is a professional golfer who grew up playing at Bay Hill, where he won the club championship at age 15. Sam attended Clemson University in South Carolina on a golf scholarship and turned pro in 2008. Saunders stated that Palmer's family nickname is "Dumpy". Arnold married his second wife, Kathleen Gawthrop, in 2005 in Hawaii.

During the spring and summer months, Palmer resided in Latrobe, and he spent winters in Orlando and La Quinta, California. He first visited Orlando in 1948 during a college match. When he took up residence in Orlando, Palmer helped the city become a recreation destination, "turning the entire state of Florida into a golfing paradise". That included building one of the premier events on the PGA Tour there along with his contributing to new hospitals. On hearing about Palmer's death, Tiger Woods said, "My kids were born at the Winnie Palmer Hospital for Women & Babies, and his philanthropic work will be remembered along with his accomplishments in golf." Arnold Palmer Boulevard is named in his honor.

Palmer was a member of the Freemasons since 1958. Palmer created the Arnie's Army Charitable Foundation to help children and youth. The Foundation saw the creation of the Winnie Palmer Hospital for Women & Babies Center, The Howard Philips Center for Children & Families, the Arnold Palmer Hospital for Children, and the Winnie Palmer Nature Reserve. He and O.J. Simpson were spokespersons for Hertz Rent-a-Car. Palmer served on the advisory board of U.S. English, a group that supports making English the official language of the United States.

During his playing career, Palmer smoked cigarettes, which caused him to battle an addiction to nicotine. He noted that many of his colleagues smoked, and he even endorsed the product in television commercials. Later in life, Palmer made a complete about-face and urged the public to give up smoking. He said that cigarette smoking has a negative effect on every organ in the body. As a testimonial for smoking cessation products, he was depicted in a 1989 photo by Robert Straus that was subject to copyright litigation as late as 20 years later.

Palmer was a Republican, and donated money to Pat Toomey, John McCain, Mitt Romney, Rick Santorum and George W. Bush. He was approached on multiple occasions by the Republican Party encouraging him to run for political office, but declined on each occasion.

Pilot

Palmer's early "fear of flying" was what led him to pursue his pilot certificate. After almost 55 years, he logged nearly 20,000 hours of flight time in various aircraft. His personal website reads:

On Palmer's 70th birthday in 1999, Westmoreland County Airport in Latrobe was renamed Arnold Palmer Regional Airport in his honor. According to their website: "[The airport] started as the Longview Flying Field in 1924. It became J.D. Hill Airport in 1928, Latrobe Airport in 1935 and Westmoreland County Airport in 1978. Complementing a rich history rooted in some of the earliest pioneers of aviation, the name was changed to Arnold Palmer Regional in 1999 to honor the Latrobe native golf legend who grew up less than a mile from the runway where he watched the world's first official airmail pickup in 1939 and later learned to fly himself." There is a statue of Palmer made by Zenos Frudakis, holding a golf club in front of the airport's entrance, unveiled in 2007.

Palmer thought he would pilot a plane for the last time on January 31, 2011, and flew from Palm Springs in California to Orlando in his Cessna Citation X. His pilot's medical certificate expired that day and he chose not to renew it. However, public FAA records show he was issued a new third-class medical in May 2011.

Books
 A Life Well Played: My Stories (2016) 
 Reflections on the Game (2012, with Thomas Hauser. Originally published as Arnold Palmer: A Personal Journey, 1994) 
 Arnold Palmer: Memories, Stories, and Memorabilia from a Life on and off the Course (2004) 
 Playing by the Rules: The Rules of Golf Explained & Illustrated from a Lifetime in the Game (2002)  
 A Golfer's Life (1999, with James Dodson) 
 Arnold Palmer's Complete Book of Putting (1986, with Peter Dobereiner) 
 Arnold Palmer's Best 54 Golf Holes (1977) 
 Go for Broke! My Philosophy of Winning Golf (1973, with William Barry Furlong) 
 495 Golf Lessons (1973, with Earl Puckett) 
 Golf Tactics (1970) 
 Situation Golf (1970) 
 My Game and Yours (1965)

Death
Palmer died on September 25, 2016 (shortly after his 87th birthday) while awaiting heart surgery at the University of Pittsburgh Medical Center (Shadyside) in Pittsburgh, Pennsylvania. He was admitted three days earlier to undergo testing on his heart. After his funeral, he was cremated and his ashes were scattered in his hometown at Latrobe Country Club. His estate was valued at $875 million and was divided between his two daughters, his second wife (who received $10 million), eight employees who received $25,000 each, and his charity, Arnie's Army, which received $10 million.

Tributes

Less than a week after Palmer died, his life was celebrated by both teams at the Ryder Cup at Hazeltine National Golf Club in Chaska, Minnesota, just outside the Twin Cities. The celebration included a video tribute and a moment of silence during the opening ceremony, which also included tributes from the opposing captains - Davis Love III for Team USA and Northern Ireland's Darren Clarke for Team Europe - and the opposing honorary captains - Nicklaus for Team USA and England's Tony Jacklin for Team Europe. During the matches, the players paid tribute to Palmer, which included wearing a special logo, button and pin. Palmer's bag from the 1975 Ryder Cup was also placed on the first tee as a tribute. Palmer had won more than 22 Ryder Cup matches and had also captained Team USA to two victories, in addition to holding or being tied for the records for youngest captain, most career singles points and most points in a single Ryder Cup. PGA of America president Derek Sprague stated: 

Two days after a 17–11 victory, which marked the first American Ryder Cup triumph since 2008 at Valhalla and which Love dedicated to Palmer, the majority of the team attended the memorial service for Palmer at St. Vincent College in Latrobe and also brought the trophy after Palmer's daughter Amy asked the team if they could do so.

A Golden Palm Star on the Palm Springs Walk of Stars was dedicated to Palmer on January 1, 2017.

The United States Postal Service issued a commemorative stamp honoring Palmer on March 4, 2020.

Amateur wins
 1946 WPIAL Championship, PIAA Championship
 1947 WPIAL Championship, PIAA Championship, Western Pennsylvania Junior, Western Pennsylvania Amateur
 1948 Southern Conference Championship, Sunnehanna Invitational, Western Pennsylvania Junior
 1950 Southern Intercollegiate, Western Pennsylvania Amateur, Greensburg Invitational
 1951 Western Pennsylvania Amateur, Worsham Memorial
 1952 Western Pennsylvania Amateur, Greensburg Invitational
 1953 Ohio Amateur, Cleveland Amateur, Greensburg Invitational, Mayfield Heights Open, Evergreen Pitch and Putt Invitational
 1954 U.S. Amateur, Ohio Amateur, All-American Amateur, Atlantic Coast Conference Championship, Bill Waite Memorial

Amateur major wins (1)

Results timeline

R256, R128, R64, R32, R16, QF, SF = Round in which player lost in match play

Source:

Professional wins (95)

PGA Tour wins (62)

PGA Tour playoff record (14–10)

Source:

European Tour wins (2)

Canadian Tour wins (1)

Australian wins (2)

Latin American wins (2)
 1956 Panama Open, Colombian Open

Other wins (11)

*Note: The 1963 Canada Cup was shortened to 63 holes due to fog.

Senior PGA Tour wins (10)

Senior PGA Tour playoff record (2–1)

Other senior wins (5)
 1984 Doug Sanders Celebrity Pro-Am
 1986 Union Mutual Classic
 1990 Senior Skins Game
 1992 Senior Skins Game
 1993 Senior Skins Game

Playoff record
PGA Tour of Australasia playoff record (0–1)

Major championships

Wins (7)

1Defeated Player (2nd) and Finsterwald (3rd) in an 18-hole playoff; Palmer (68), Player (71) and Finsterwald (77). 1st, 2nd and 3rd places awarded in this playoff.

Results timeline

CUT = missed the half-way cut
WD = withdrew
"T" = tied

Summary

 Most consecutive cuts made – 26 (1958 Masters – 1965 Masters)
 Longest streak of top-10s – 6 (1966 Masters – 1967 U.S. Open)

Senior major championships

Wins (5)

a This was the January edition of the tournament.
1 Palmer won this with a birdie on the first playoff hole.
2 Won in an 18-hole playoff, Palmer shot a (70) to Stone's (74) and Casper's (77).

U.S. national team appearances
Professional
Ryder Cup: 1961 (winners), 1963 (winners, playing captain), 1965 (winners), 1967 (winners), 1971 (winners), 1973 (winners), 1975 (winners, non-playing captain)
World Cup: 1960 (winners), 1962 (winners), 1963 (winners), 1964 (winners), 1966 (winners), 1967 (winners, individual winner)
Presidents Cup: 1996 (winners, non-playing captain)
UBS Cup: 2001 (winners, captain), 2002 (winners, captain), 2003 (tie, captain), 2004 (winners, captain)

See also

 Arnold Palmer Cup
 Arnold Palmer (drink)
 Arnold Palmer Center for Golf History
 Arnold Palmer Tournament Golf (video game)
 List of celebrities who own wineries and vineyards
 List of golfers with most PGA Tour wins
 List of golfers with most wins in one PGA Tour event
 List of golfers with most PGA Tour Champions wins
 List of golfers with most Champions Tour major championship wins
 List of men's major championships winning golfers
 Longest PGA Tour win streaks
 Most PGA Tour wins in a year

References

External links

Arnold Palmer Invitational – PGA Tour event
Arnold Palmer Design Company
Arnold Palmer Hospital for Children
Arnold Palmer's Restaurant in La Quinta, California
Bay Hill Club and Lodge – Palmer's winter home course
Latrobe Country Club – Palmer's summer home course
Arnold Palmer Tee – Palmer's namesake half iced tea and half lemonade drink
American Society of Golf Course Architects profile 

 
American male golfers
Wake Forest Demon Deacons men's golfers
PGA Tour golfers
PGA Tour Champions golfers
Winners of men's major golf championships
Winners of senior major golf championships
World Golf Hall of Fame inductees
Ryder Cup competitors for the United States
Golf course architects
Golf writers and broadcasters
Golfers from Pennsylvania
Military personnel from Pennsylvania
Writers from Pennsylvania
Presidential Medal of Freedom recipients
Congressional Gold Medal recipients
United States Coast Guard non-commissioned officers
American aviators
American Freemasons
People from Latrobe, Pennsylvania
Golfers from Orlando, Florida
People from La Quinta, California
Pennsylvania Republicans
1929 births
2016 deaths